The 2016–17 season is Académica's first season in the LigaPro following their relegation from the Primeira Liga last season. This season they also participated in the Taça de Portugal and Taça da Liga.

Pre-season and friendlies

Competitions

Overall record

LigaPro

League table

Results by round

Matches

Taça de Portugal

Second round

Third round

Fourth round

Fifth round

Quarter-finals

Taça da Liga

First round

Players

Appearances and goals

|-
! colspan="14" style="background:#dcdcdc; text-align:center"| Goalkeepers

|-
! colspan="14" style="background:#dcdcdc; text-align:center"| Defenders

|-
! colspan="14" style="background:#dcdcdc; text-align:center"| Midfielders

|-
! colspan="14" style="background:#dcdcdc; text-align:center"| Forwards

|-

Transfers

Summer

In:

Out:

Winter

In:

Out:

Coaching staff

References

2016-17
Portuguese football clubs 2016–17 season